Highway 916 is a provincial highway in the north-west region of the Canadian province of Saskatchewan. It runs from Highway 2 to Highway 924. Highway 916 is about 112 km (70 mi) long.

Highway 916 also connects with Highway 922, Highway 917, Highway 929, Highway 921, and Highway 939.

Highway 916 provides access to two provincial recreation sites, Smoothstone Lake and Elaine Lake.

See also 
Roads in Saskatchewan
Transportation in Saskatchewan

References 

916